McDowell County Schools is the operating school district within McDowell County, West Virginia. It is governed by the McDowell County Board of Education.

Board of Education
The School Board is made up of five members, each elected to a four-year term in a nonpartisan election. The Board also appoints the superintendent. Current members:

Carolyn Falin is the Superintendent.

Unions
AFT-McDowell Local 4906 is the locally chartered union of the American Federation of Teachers. AFT-McDowell represents only teachers in McDowell County.  AFT-McDowell is a local affiliate of AFT-West Virginia. All AFT local unions are affiliated with the National and WV AFL-CIO 

Two unions represent service personnel employed by McDowell County Schools. The Paraprofessional and School-Related Personnel (PSRP) division of the American Federation of Teachers, AFL-CIO and The West Virginia School Service Personnel (WVSSPA). School service personnel include non-administrative office employees, aides, custodians, transportation, maintenance, and school meal providers.

The McDowell County Education Association (MCEA) is an association of school administrators and teachers for this school district. Gwen Lacy is the President. It is a local affiliate of the West Virginia Education Association.

Schools

High schools
Mount View High School 
River View High School

Middle schools
Mount View Middle School (The middle school at Mount View shares a campus with the high school, but has its own office and administration.)
Sandy River Middle School

Elementary schools
Bradshaw Elementary School
Fall River Elementary School
Iaeger Elementary School
Kimball Elementary School
Southside K–8 School
Welch Elementary School

Career training centers
McDowell County Adult Learning Center
McDowell County Vocational Technical Center

Schools no longer in operation

High schools
Big Creek High School
Elkorn High School 
Excelsior High School
Gary High School 
Iaeger High School
Kimball High School
Northfork-Elkhorn High School
Northfork High School
Welch High School

Junior high schools
Anawalt Junior High School
Berwind Junior High School
Bradshaw Junior High School
Coalwood Junior High
Davy Junior High
Hemphill-Capels Junior High
Keystone Junior High School
Kimball Junior High School
Northfork Middle School
War Junior High School
Welch Middle School

Elementary schools
Anawalt Elementary School
Asco Grade School
Bartley Elementary School
Berwind Elementary School 
Caretta Elementary School
Davy Elementary School
Eckman Elementary School
Gary Elementary School
Hemphill Elementary School
Jolo Elementary School
Keystone Elementary School
Mohegan Elementary School
Panther Elementary School
Roderfield Grade School
Superior-Maitland Grade School
Switchback Elementary School
War Elementary School

References

External links

School districts in West Virginia
Education in McDowell County, West Virginia